Juan Tamariz-Martel Negrón (born 18 October 1942, Madrid) known professionally as Juan Tamariz or just Tamariz, is a Spanish magician. 

Tamariz is considered to have pionereed close-up card magic. American stage magician Ricky Jay once said he considered him to be a magician people will remember, and he was referred to as "the greatest and most influential card magician alive" by David Blaine. Tamariz performed at FISM in 2006 Stockholm, 2009 Beijing China, 2015 Rimini Italy and 2018 Busan South Korea.

A celebrity of television and stage in Spain and South America, Tamariz has authored six books translated into English: The Five Points in Magic, The Magic Way, Sonata, Mnemonica, Verbal Magic, and The Magic Rainbow.

Career

Television 
Tamariz appeared regularly on Spanish television over the span of almost 2 decades.

In 1994, he appeared on the NBC special The World’s Greatest Magic.

Books 
 Monedas, monedas... (y monedas) (1969, CYMYS).
 Truki-cartomagia (1970, CYMYS). In collaboration with Ramón Varela
 Aprenda Usted Magia (1973, CYMYS).
 Magia en el Bar (1975, CYMYS).
 Magicolor: (la magia del cambio de color) (1977, CYMYS).
 Enciclopedia del forzaje (1980, Self Published — photocopy).
 Los Cinco Puntos Mágicos (1982,Editorial Frakson).
 Revised (1988, Editorial Frakson).
 Revised (2005, Editorial Frakson).
 English Version: The Five Points in Magic (2007, Hermetic Press).
 Por arte de magia: Historia de los autómatas precedida de la historia de la prestidigitación y manipulación. (1982, Puntual).
 La Vía Mágica (1988, Editorial Frakson).
 Second Edition, Spanish (2011, Editorial Frakson).
 English Version: The Magic Way (2014, Hermetic Press).
 Sonata: Música Bruja Vol I (1989, Editorial Frakson).
 English Version: Bewitched Music, Vol. 1: Sonata, translation: Donald Lehn,  (1991, Editorial Frakson).
 Secretos de magia potagia. Volumen 2 de La biblioteca encantada de Juan Tamariz. (1990, Editorial Frakson).
 La sangre del turco.  Volumen 3 de La biblioteca encantada de Juan Tamariz. (1990, Editorial Frakson).
 El Mundo mágico de Tamariz (1991, Ediciones del Prado).
 La magia del falso pulgar: (teoría, técnica y práctica) (1992, Producciones Mágicas Tamariz).
 Sinfonía en mnemónica mayor: la baraja mnemónica de Tamariz. Volumen 2 de Música bruja (2000, Producciones Mágicas Tamariz)
 English Version: Mnemonica (2004, Hermetic Press).
 Por arte de verbimagia (2005, Producciones Mágicas Tamariz)
 English Version: Verbal Magic (2008, Hermetic Press).
 El Arcoiris Mágico (2016, Gema Navarro).
 English Version: The Magic Rainbow (2019).

Awards

Spain 
 Second Prize in Congreso Mágico Nacional de Zaragoza, 1962.
 As de Cartomagia (Ace of card magic) in the first magical contest of Madrid.
 Great Prize in the IV Congreso Nacional de Magia de San Sebastián, April 1972.
 The Council of Ministers of Spain awarded him the Medalla de Oro al Mérito en las Bellas Artes (Gold Medal for Merit in Fine Arts), April 2011.
 The Madrid City Council awarded him the Gold Medal of the city, May 2019.

International 

 2° Price on Micromagic, with Juan Antón (routine: Los Mancos), FISM Amsterdam XI, 1970.

 1° Price on Close-up Card, FISM Paris XII 1973.

 Mention as Magician of the Year, by the Academy of Magical Arts, 1992.

 Mention as Performing Fellowship, by the Academy of Magical Arts, 2000.

 Special Award on Theory & Philosophy, FISM Beijing XXIV 2009.

 Mention as Master Fellowship, by the Academy of Magical Arts, 2012.

 The John Nevil Maskelyne Prize (2013)

See also
List of magicians

References

External links
 

1942 births
Living people
Spanish magicians
Spanish television presenters
Sleight of hand
Card magic
Academy of Magical Arts Magician of the Year winners
Academy of Magical Arts Masters Fellowship winners
Academy of Magical Arts Performing Fellowship winners